Henrich is both a surname and a given name. Notable people with the name include:

Surname
 Adam Henrich (born 1984), Canadian former ice hockey player
 Allison Henrich (born 1980), American mathematician
 Bernhard Henrich, set decorator
 Bobby Henrich (born 1938), American former Major League Baseball player
 Christy Henrich (1972–1994), American gymnast
 Daniel Henrich (born 1991), German footballer
 Dieter Henrich (1927-2022), German philosopher
 Joseph Henrich, American anthropologist
 Michael Henrich (born 1980), Canadian former ice hockey player
 Rolf Henrich (born 1944), German writer and lawyer, a co-founder and leading member of the New Forum movement
 Tommy Henrich (1913–2009), American Major League Baseball player

Given name
 Henrich Benčík (born 1978), Slovak former footballer
 Henrich Ernst Graf zu Stolberg-Wernigerode (1716–1778), German politician, canon, dean and author of hymns
 Henrich Focke (1890–1979), German aviation pioneer, co-founder of the Focke-Wulf company
 Henrich Herman Foss, Norwegian Minister of the Navy 1845-1848
 Henrich R. Greve (born 1966), Norwegian organizational theorist
 Henrich Jaborník (born 1991), Slovak ice hockey player
 Henrich Krummedige (1464–1530), Danish-Norwegian nobleman
 Henrich Oberholtzer (1739–1813), American whiskey distiller and founder of the Overholt Whiskey distillery
 Henrich Ravas (born 1997), Slovak football goalkeeper
 Henrich Ručkay (born 1983), Slovak ice hockey player
 Henrich Smet (1535 or 1537—1614), Flemish physician and humanist scholar

See also
 Heinrich (disambiguation)
 Henrik
 Henrichs
 Hendrich (disambiguation)

Masculine given names
Surnames from given names